Sonopress (known as Arvato Entertainment from 2008-2015), is the CD and DVD replication business of Bertelsmann. Founded in 1958 to supply gramophone record for Bertelsmann's music club and music label businesses, Sonopress became the world's second biggest replicator of optical discs (CDs and DVDs). Much of that growth was overseen by long term CEO Uwe Swientek, who was at the company's helm for almost 30 years. Sonopress has factories and sales offices on all five continents, and predominantly serves customers in the music, software, and video game industry.

It was one of the four major units of Arvato AG, the media and communications services company that in turn is one of the six divisions of Bertelsmann. Accordingly, Sonopress was occasionally referred to as Arvato Storage Media. In 2008, to celebrate 50 years in the business, the name Sonopress was dropped and replaced by Arvato Digital Services.

In Jan 7, 2013, Arvato Digital Services North America spun off the replication business into Arvato Entertainment LLC.

In 2015, Arvato Entertainment was re-organized and is now doing business under its former name (i.e. Sonopress) within the Bertelsmann Printing Group division.

References

External links

Bertelsmann subsidiaries
Compact disc